The Middle Tong-Tai dialect is a branch of the Tong-Tai dialect and is mainly used in the districts including Rugao, Rudong (excluding Binfang), Taixing, east of Dongtai, east of Hai'an and southwest of Jinhai, China.  Although it is divided into the category of Jianghuai Mandarin, a communication barrier still exists between it and other dialects of Jianghuai Mandarin like the Yangzhou dialect. The reason could be that these areas are closely bonded on the Wu region in history. For example, there is much marked bottom preservation of Wu Chinese in vernaculars of Rudong.
So it can seem as a dialect based on Wu, but later reformed by Jianghuai Mandarin. Or as an interim zone between Wu and Jianghuai.

References

Mandarin Chinese